The Normals is a 2012 American comedy film starring Bryan Greenberg.  It is based on the novel of the same name by David Gilbert.

Cast
Bryan Greenberg as Billy Schine
Jess Weixler as Gretchen
Fred Weller as Lannigan
Josh Pais as Dr. Honeysack
Reg E. Cathey as Rodney
John Sayles as Dr. Marx
Brooke Bloom as Nurse Longley
Brad Calcaterra as Stew
Kelli Crump as Joy
Matthew J. McCarthy as Ossap
Tim O’Halloran as Dullick
Debargo Sanyal as Sameer
Jon Norman Schneider as Do
Dan Hedaya as Ragnar
Mishka Balilty as Yellow Patient
Peter Mark Bockman as Orderly
Gerard Cordero as Orderly

References

External links
 
 

American comedy films
Films based on American novels
2010s English-language films
2010s American films